Bath is a borough in Northampton County, Pennsylvania. As of the 2020 census, Bath had a population of 2,808. It is part of the Lehigh Valley metropolitan area, which had a population of 861,899 and was the 68th most populous metropolitan area in the U.S. as of the 2020 census.

History
Bath is located at the head of the Monocacy Creek (Lehigh River tributary) in an area of the Lehigh Valley that was once rich in agriculture. The greater area of the town, however, lies east of the Monocacy Valley.

Bath was established in 1728 as a Scotch-Irish settlement before the American Revolution as the first settlement by white people in the Forks of the Delaware. It is named for Bath, Somerset, England by Margaret DeLancey, who sold land under her father, lieutenant colonel of the Continental Army, William Allen, in the 1700s.

On March 3, 1737, the 247 acres of land that is currently inside the boundaries of Bath was purchased and surveyed for Daniel Craig. According to borough historians, this land spans from Chestnut Street to the north of Northampton Street. William Allen conveyed the greater part of Bath's land to his son, Andrew, in 1776, the same year American declared its freedom from the British. That same year, Andrew Allen sold 150 acres of the land to John Lattimore. Andrew Allen also owned land west of the Monocacy, which was eventually confiscated and sold to local families in the area. Today, Bath's current acreage is 576 acres and is less than 1 sq. mi. in area.

On August 18, 2012, Bath celebrated its 275th anniversary. In 1999, the Bath Business and Community Partnership (BBCP) was established for managing urban revitalization initiatives, including creating a greener town, organizing volunteers, and developing economic restructuring/asset enhancement.

Geography
Bath is located at  (40.726556, -75.390338). Bath is also 100 miles (160 km) southwest of New York City and 60 miles (96 km) northwest of Philadelphia. It is also located near Wind Gap as well as the Delaware and Lehigh water gaps. The Monocacy Creek, a tributary of the Lehigh River, flows through the town's center. A small park around the creek is located between Main and Northampton streets. Many mills have been built using the creek's water in millraces.

Government 
Bath's government involves a mayor, seven council members, and a tax collector. The current mayor is Fiorella ‘Fi’ Reginelli-Mirabito; Michele Ehrgott is Council President; Frank Hesch is Council Vice President. Michele Ehrgott made local history as the first woman to serve as Borough Council President. 
The town's general budget is $1.6 million with an assessed valuation of over $53.1 million. Bath represents the 138th House of Representatives District, the 16th Senate District, and the 7th Congressional District.

Demographics

As of the census estimates of 2011, there were 2,699 people living in Bath, an increase of 0.7% from 2000. There are 1,298 males (48.2%) and 1,398 females (51.8%). The population density was 2,890 people per square mile (1,148.9/km2). There were 1,126 housing units at an average density of 1,244.8 per square mile (483.1/km2). Racially, the borough consists of 88.9% White, 2.2% African American, 0.01% Native American, 1.0% Asian, and 1.3% from two or more races.

The most common ancestries in Bath are German (33.2%), Irish (13.1%), Italian (10.2%), English (4.7%), and Polish (3.7%). The percentage of married families in Bath is 52.5%, while those who have never been married are 24.4%. Divorced residents account for 11.8%, followed by widowed (8.9%) and separated (2.3%) residents. The number of people over the age of 25 with at least a high school diploma is 76.9%. Those with a bachelor's degree or higher is 14.8% and residents with at least a graduate or professional degree is 5.9%. The unemployment percentage in August 2012 was 8.7%. In 2009, the median income for a household in the borough was $43,983 and the per capita income for the borough was $21,999. The average house or condo value was $194,522 and the average cost for rent was $791. For houses with mortgages, the average property tax was $3,051. About 6.4% of families and 7.9% of the population were below the poverty line, including 10.9% of those under age 18 and 12.6% of those age 65 or over.

Community organizations 
Bath is home to several organizations, including include the American Legion Eckley E. Patch Post 470, the BBCP, the Bath-East Allen Youth Club, Bath Improvements Committee, Bath Museum Committee, Bath Lions Club, Bath Lioness Club, Bath Lions Midget Football Committee, Governor Wolf Historical Society, Historical Architectural Review Board, Mid-County Senior Center, and the Park, Recreation, & Shade Tree Commission. There is also a Crime Watch in place. The Monocacy Creek Watershed Association is active in Bath, which helps protect the Monocacy Creek. They hold creek cleanups and other conservation efforts throughout the year.

The four recreational areas in Bath include the Volunteer Firefighter's Park, Keystone Park, Ciff Cowling Field, and Carl L. Rehrig Park.

Locations
 Bath Farmer's Market is located adjacent to the American Legion on Rt. 329 and offers local, fresh products from vegetables and bakery items to handmade soap. It is open from May–September on Fridays from 3-7 p.m.
 The Wesselhoeft House was the first homeopathic school of medicine, located on Chestnut Street in 1829.
 The Bath Museum is located at the municipal building.  Items from the 1800s and up are displayed and the committee who runs the Museum are responsible for the permanent care of the artifacts. The Bath Museum is open 10:00 A.M. – 2:00 P.M. every third (3rd) Saturday of the month with the exception of December, when it will be open the first (1st) Saturday, per the Museum's website.
The Daniel Steckel House was added to the National Register of Historic Places in 1982. Daniel Steckel built this house for his wife, Rebecca, in 1804, and raised 6 children. Steckel was a prominent man in Bath in the 1800s and lived to be 101 years old. The house was featured in Early American Life magazine in October 2011 and is registered with the National Register, the Pennsylvania Inventory of Historic Places, and the Bath Historic District. It is currently a bed-and-breakfast.
 The Lee and Virginia Graver Arboretum is owned by Muhlenberg College and located in Bath. The arboretum is free and features native and rare trees and various species of flowers.
 Sacred Heart of Jesus Parish is a Catholic church located on Washington Street. After the affiliated Sacred Heart School closed, Kolbe Academy Recovery High School has opened at the location.
 Malta Hall is a building located at 143 E Main Street Bath, Pennsylvania. It was built in 1855. In 1874, it was Bath Marbleworks, which was owned by Jeremiah Reinhard. It manufactured marble mantels, tombstones, monuments, and brownstone. After the marbleworks left, it became Carpenter Hall, then Bath High School, Scout Hall, Bath Public Library, and more. It is now a private home.

Transportation

Numbered highways passing through Bath include Pennsylvania Route 248, Pennsylvania Route 329, Pennsylvania Route 512 and Pennsylvania Route 987. PA 248 follows an east-west alignment through the borough via West Main Street, Chestnut Street and Northampton Street. PA 329 begins at PA 248 and heads southwest along Race Street. PA 512 follows a north-south alignment via Walnut Street. Finally, PA 987 follows a north-south alignment via Race Street, West Main Street and Chestnut Street, including a concurrency with PA 329 and another with PA 248.

Public education
The borough is served by the Northampton Area School District. Students in grades nine through 12 attend Northampton Area High School in Northampton.

The borough is also home to George Wolf Elementary School, which opened in 1968. It has twenty-three classrooms, a library, music room and a multipurpose room. In 1974, additions were added that included a gymnasium and twelve more classrooms. They also have three Intermediate Unit #20 classrooms. George Wolf Elementary School is named after George Wolf, a local resident and Governor of Pennsylvania from 1829 to 1835.  He is known as the father of the free public school system in Pennsylvania because of his effort in passing of the Free School Act of 1834.  His original Wolf Academy is located approximately one mile from the school.

As of 2022, Kolbe Academy Recovery High School is now located on Washington Street in Bath. It is the first Catholic recovery school in the United States.

Media
The Home News is a weekly newspaper focusing on Bath and surrounding communities. It was first published in 1942.

Notable people
Matt Christopher, former children's author 
Arthur Granville Dewalt, former U.S. Congressman

References

External links
 Borough of Bath official website

1816 establishments in Pennsylvania
Boroughs in Northampton County, Pennsylvania
Boroughs in Pennsylvania
Populated places established in 1816